The MPR/DPR/DPD Building, also known as the MPR/DPR Building is the seat of government for the Indonesian legislative branch of government, which consists of the People's Consultative Assembly (MPR), the People's Representative Council (DPR) and the Regional Representatives Council (DPD).

History

Construction

Under Sukarno 
Construction of the building was ordered on 8 March 1965 by Sukarno, the first president of Indonesia, through the Decree of the President of the Republic of Indonesia Number 48/1965. The building was intended to house the Conference of New Emerging Forces (CONEFO), a now defunct alternative for the United Nations, with the first conference being scheduled for 1966. The members of the organization were planned to consist of the countries of Asia, Africa, Latin America, and the Non-Aligned Movement.

The first conference was scheduled for 1966, and the building was scheduled for completion before 17 August 1966, leaving 17 months for construction. Construction began in March 1965 following a contest for the design, which resulted in the design by architect Soejoedi Wirjoatmodjo being agreed upon and ratified by president Sukarno on February 22, 1965.

Under Suharto 
Construction was hampered due to the coup attempt of 30 September 1965. CONEFO idea was soon abandoned after Sukarno's fall, but work on the building was resumed based on the Decree of the Presidium of the Ampera Cabinet Number 79/U/Kep/11/1966 dated November 9, 1966, whose designation was changed to the MPR/DPR RI Building.

Gradually, construction was completed and handed over to the Secretariat General of the DPR: Main Conference Building in March 1968, Secretariat Building and Health Center Building (March 1978), Auditorium Building (September 1982), and Banquet Building (February 1983).

May 1998

In May 1998, the buildings were occupied by about 80,000 tertiary students  protesting against the Trisakti shootings, the continuing presidency of Suharto and calling for the dissolution of the People's Representative Council and People's Consultative Assembly for 1998–2003 period.

Buildings
The complex comprises six buildings. The main building is Nusantara with its unique Garuda wing-shaped roof and contains the 1,700-seat plenary meeting hall. The other five buildings are Nusantara I a 23-storey building containing legislature members' offices and meeting rooms, Nusantara II and Nusantara III, which contain committee meeting rooms and offices, Nusantara IV, used for conferences and ceremonies, and Nusantara V, which has a 500-seat plenary hall.

References

Citations

Bibliography

External links

 History of the DPR/MPR Building 
 Occupation of the DPR/MPR Building 
 Ex-Reform activist:No manipulation in the DPR/MPR building occupation 

Buildings and structures completed in 1983
Buildings and structures in Jakarta
People's Consultative Assembly
Seats of national legislatures